Sword of the Dark Ones is a manga by Tsukasa Kotobuki, and it is based on a story by Kentaro Yasui. This series is also known in Japan by the title . In North America the story is published by CMX.

Plot 
This story takes place in the fictional Ragnarok continent, which includes the Asgard Empire.  People live their lives in constant fear as the land is overrun by flesh-eating monsters known as "The Dark Ones".  They roam the land and hunt from the darkness killing indiscriminately. To combat this threat, a guild of mercenaries was formed. One man in particular has built a reputation as an especially fierce monster-killer, a man known as Leroy Schwartz, or the Black Lightning. He is a man with a mission to accomplish and a vow to fulfill, his only companionship lying in his sentient long-sword Ragnarok.

Characters 
Leroy Schwartz:  The protagonist of the manga, Leroy has super-human speed, strength, and stamina.  He is accompanied by his sentient sword, Ragnarok.  He is quick-thinking, though sometimes he can be irrational.  He despises those who kill for no motive other than profit.  He keeps sealed within him an immense power, along with feelings of isolation from other humans because he is a Demon.  The power within him only manifests itself forcefully whenever Leroy sustains critical damage.

Ragnarok:  Leroy's sentient sword.  Ragnarok is cautious and calculating, making him a perfect foil of Leroy.  In times of danger, Ragnarok is able to manifest himself in human form.

Lena Northlight:  An assassin who kills without regret or hesitation.  She seems cold-hearted and fierce, but bears a soft spot for her kid sister.  She asks Leroy to help find her sister, who is held captive in the Crimson Despair's headquarters.

External links 
 
Sword of the Dark Ones page at CMX

CMX (comics) titles
Shōnen manga